Ilybius is a large genus of predatory aquatic beetles in the family Dytiscidae. The genus is native to the Palearctic (including Europe), the Near East, the Nearctic, and North Africa. 70 species has been described from this genus:

 Ilybius aenescens Thomson, 1870
 Ilybius albarracinensis (Fery, 1986)
 Ilybius angustior (Gyllenhal, 1808)
 Ilybius anjarum Nilsson, 1999
 Ilybius apicalis Sharp, 1873
 Ilybius ater (De Geer, 1774)
 Ilybius austrodiscors (Larson, 1996)
 Ilybius balkei (Fery & Nilsson, 1993)
 Ilybius bedeli (Zaitzev, 1908)
 Ilybius biguttulus (Germar, 1824)
 Ilybius boryslavicus Lomnicki, 1894
 Ilybius chalconatus (Panzer, 1796)
 Ilybius chishimanus Kôno, 1944
 Ilybius churchillensis Wallis, 1939
 Ilybius cinctus Sharp, 1878
 Ilybius confertus (LeConte, 1861)
 Ilybius confusus Aubé, 1838
 Ilybius crassus Thomson, 1856
 Ilybius dettneri (Fery, 1986)
 Ilybius discedens Sharp, 1882
 Ilybius discors (LeConte, 1861)
 Ilybius erichsoni (Gemminger & Harold, 1868)
 Ilybius euryomus (Larson, 1996)
 Ilybius fenestratus (Fabricius, 1781)
 Ilybius fraterculus LeConte, 1862
 Ilybius fuliginosus (Fabricius, 1792)
 Ilybius gagates (Aubé, 1838)
 Ilybius guttiger (Gyllenhal, 1808)
 Ilybius hozgargantae (Burmeister, 1983)
 Ilybius hulae (Wewalka, 1984)
 Ilybius hypomelas (Mannerheim, 1843)
 Ilybius ignarus (LeConte, 1862)
 Ilybius incarinatus Zimmermann, 1928
 Ilybius jaechi (Fery & Nilsson, 1993)
 Ilybius jimzim (Larson, 1996)
 Ilybius lagabrunensis (Schizzerotto & Fery, 1990)
 Ilybius larsoni (Fery & Nilsson, 1993)
 Ilybius lateralis (Gebler, 1832)
 Ilybius lenensis Nilsson, 2000
 Ilybius lenkoranensis (Fery & Nilsson, 1993)
 Ilybius lineellus (LeConte, 1861)
 Ilybius meridionalis Aubé, 1837
 Ilybius montanus (Stephens, 1828)
 Ilybius nakanei Nilsson, 1994
 Ilybius neglectus (Erichson, 1837)
 Ilybius oblitus Sharp, 1882
 Ilybius obtusus Sharp, 1882
 Ilybius opacus (Aubé, 1837)
 Ilybius ovalis Gschwendtner, 1934
 Ilybius pederzanii (Fery & Nilsson, 1993)
 Ilybius picipes (Kirby, 1837)
 Ilybius pleuriticus LeConte, 1850
 Ilybius poppiusi Zaitzev, 1907
 Ilybius pseudoneglectus (Franciscolo, 1972)
 Ilybius quadriguttatus (Lacordaire, 1835)
 Ilybius quadrimaculatus Aubé, 1838
 Ilybius samokovi (Fery & Nilsson, 1993)
 Ilybius satunini (Zaitzev, 1913)
 Ilybius similis Thomson, 1856
 Ilybius subaeneus Erichson, 1837
 Ilybius subtilis (Erichson, 1837)
 Ilybius thynias Fery & Przewozny, 2011
 Ilybius vancouverensis (Leech, 1937)
 Ilybius vandykei (Leech, 1942)
 Ilybius verisimilis (Brown, 1932)
 Ilybius vittiger (Gyllenhal, 1827)
 Ilybius walsinghami (Crotch, 1873)
 Ilybius wasastjernae (C.R.Sahlberg, 1824)
 Ilybius wewalkai (Fery & Nilsson, 1993)

References

External links
Ilybius at Fauna Europaea

 
Dytiscidae genera